= Military night =

Rule that complaints must be made a day later

A military night or Prussian night refers to the custom of allowing complaints and the like no sooner than the following day in order to allow for a rethinking of the occasion overnight.

This custom originated with the Prussian and British Armies and continues in force in some military forces, as set out in the Military Complaints Regulations of the German Armed Forces or the General Regulations of the Austrian Armed Forces.
